Bellamya is a genus of freshwater snails with a gill and an operculum, aquatic gastropod mollusks in the family Viviparidae. 

Bellamya is the type genus of the subfamily Bellamyinae.

Distribution
The indigenous distribution of Bellamya includes Africa and Asia.

Species
Species within the genus Bellamya include:
 Bellamya alberti (Cox, 1926) †
 Bellamya beijiangensis Yü & Zhang, 1982 †
 Bellamya campaniformis Bickel, 1976 †
 Bellamya capillata (Frauenfeld, 1865)
 Bellamya celsispiralis Gurung, Takayasu & Matsuoka, 1997 †
 Bellamya constricta (Martens, 1889)
 Bellamya contracta (Haas, 1934)
 Bellamya crassispiralis Annandale, 1921
 Bellamya crawshayi (Smith, 1893)
 Bellamya dagangensis Youluo, 1978 †
 Bellamya dissimilis (Mueller, 1774)
 Bellamya ecclesi (Crowley & Pain, 1964)
 Bellamya heudei guangdungensis (Kobelt, 1906)
 Bellamya hilmandensis (Kobelt, 1909)
 Bellamya jeffreysi (Frauenfeld, 1865)
 Bellamya jiangyouensis Yü, 1974 †
 Bellamya kowiayiensis (Brazier, 1886)
 Bellamya kweilinensis (Hsü, 1935) †
 Bellamya leopoldvillensis (Putzeys, 1898)
 Bellamya liberiana (Schepman, 1888)
 Bellamya micron Annandale, 1921
 Bellamya monardi (Haas, 1934)
 Bellamya mweruensis (Smith, 1893)
 Bellamya orlovi (Lindholm, 1932) †
 Bellamya pagodiformis (Smith, 1893)
 Bellamya phthinotropis (Martens, 1892)
 Bellamya retusa (Meek & Hayden, 1856) †
 Bellamya robertsoni (Frauenfeld, 1865)
 Bellamya rubicunda (Martens, 1879)
 Bellamya suzukii Matsuoka, 1985 †
 Bellamya tenuisculpta (von Martens, 1874) †
 Bellamya trochlearis (Martens, 1892)
 Bellamya unicolor (Olivier, 1804) - Bellamya duponti De Rochebrune, 1882 is the type species and it is probably synonym of Bellamya unicolor

synonyms
 Bellamya bengalensis (Lamarck, 1822): synonym of Filopaludina bengalensis (Lamarck, 1822)
 Bellamya chinensis (Reeve 1863): synonym of Cipangopaludina chinensis (Gray, 1834) - Chinese mystery snail
 Bellamya costulata (Martens, 1892): synonym of Bellamya constricta (von Martens, 1889) (a junior synonym)
 Bellamya crassa (Benson, 1836): synonym of Mekongia crassa (Benson, 1836) (a junior synonym)
 Bellamya jucunda (Smith, 1892): synonym of Bellamya constricta (von Martens, 1889) (a junior synonym)
 Bellamya manhongensis Zhang, Liu & Wang, 1981: synonym of Sinotaia manhongensis (W.-Z. Zhang, Y.-F. Liu & Y.-X. Wang, 1981) (original combination)

References

External links
 

Viviparidae
Gastropod genera